Tochuina gigantea, common name  the giant orange tochui, is a species of sea slug, a tritonid nudibranch, a marine gastropod mollusk in the family Tritoniidae.

Bergh (1879) used the name Tritonia tetraquetra in a sense different from Pallas (1788). The valid name for Tochuina tetraquetra sensu Bergh, 1879 is Tritonia gigantea Bergh, 1904. The complicated series of misinterpretations of Pallas' and Bergh's species are explained in a 2020 revision of the family Tritoniidae.

References

Further reading 
  Baba K. 1968. [A collection of Tochuina tetraquetra (Pallas, 1788) from Shirikishinai, Hokkaido, Japan (Gastropoda: Nudibranchia).] Collecting & Breeding [Saishu to Shiiku] 30(8):257-258, figs. 1-5.
 Baba, K. 1969. "Range extension of Tochuina tetraquetra (Pallas, 1788) to Hokkaido, North Japan (Gastropoda: Nudibranchia)". Veliger 12(1):134.

External links 
 Joseph L. Sevigny, Lauren E. Kirouac, William Kelley Thomas, Jordan S. Ramsdell, Kayla E. Lawlor, Osman Sharifi, Simarvir Grewal, Christopher Baysdorfer, Kenneth Curr, Amanda A. Naimie, Kazufusa Okamoto, James A. Murray, James M. Newcomb, 2015 The Mitochondrial Genomes of the Nudibranch Mollusks, Melibe leonina and Tritonia diomedea, and their Impact on Gastropod Phylogeny. PLOS|ONE May 21, 2015

Tritoniidae
Gastropods described in 1788